The Lolo River is a river in Gabon, and one tributary of the Ogooué River.

It rises in the Chaillu Mountains. Then, it receives water of its main tributary Bouenguidi past Koulamoutou, Ogooué-Lolo.

References

 National Geographic. 2003. African Adventure Atlas Pg 24,72. led by Sean Fraser.
 Lerique Jacques. 1983. Hydrographie-Hydrologie. in Geographie et Cartographie du Gabon, Atlas Illustré led by The Ministère de l'Education Nationale de la Republique Gabonaise. Pg 14–15. Paris, France: Edicef.

Rivers of Gabon